Archie Ray Corbin (born December 30, 1967) is a former Major League Baseball pitcher. He attended Beaumont-Charlton-Pollard HS. Archie came into the league without any college experience. He played for the Kansas City Royals in 1991, Baltimore Orioles in 1996, and Florida Marlins in 1999. Archie Corbin was drafted by the New York Mets in the amateur draft, but never played for them. Instead he started his career in 1991 with the Royals, being traded for Pat Tabler. Archie came into the league as a relief pitcher, which was a pitcher who came in later in the game to relief the previous pitcher. Archie played 3 years before retiring in 1999. After his career he continued to be around baseball, being a coach in Texas.

See also
 List of Major League Baseball single-inning strikeout leaders

External links

 http://baseballcamps.com/coachesdetail.cfm?ContentKey=209915

Major League Baseball pitchers
Kansas City Royals players
Baltimore Orioles players
Florida Marlins players
Charlotte Knights players
1967 births
Living people
Baseball players from Texas
Atlantic City Surf players
Nashua Pride players
Sportspeople from Beaumont, Texas
African-American baseball players
American expatriate baseball players in Mexico
Broncos de Reynosa players
Buffalo Bisons (minor league) players
American expatriate baseball players in Canada
Calgary Cannons players
Columbia Mets players
Harrisburg Senators players
Kingsport Mets players
Las Vegas Stars (baseball) players
Memphis Chicks players
Omaha Golden Spikes players
Rochester Red Wings players
St. Lucie Mets players
21st-century African-American people
20th-century African-American sportspeople